Neil Hamburger Sings Country Winners is the name of a 2008 album by alternative comedian Neil Hamburger. It was released by Drag City on April 21, 2008.

Track listing

"Three Piece Chicken Dinner" (2:38)
"The Recycle Bin" (3:21)
"Please Ask That Clown to Stop Crying" (4:43)
"Jug Town" (3:08)
"How Can I Still Be Patriotic (When They've Taken Away My Right to Cry)" (4:32)
"At Least I Was Paid" (3:11)
"Thinkin' It Over" (3:06)
"Garden Party II" (3:01)
"Zipper Lips Rides Again" (2:06)
"The Hula Maiden" (Mark Eitzel cover) (5:52)

Gregg Turkington albums
Drag City (record label) albums
2008 albums